Erich Stephen Gruen (born May 7, 1935) is an American classicist and ancient historian.  He was the Gladys Rehard Wood Professor of History and Classics at the University of California, Berkeley, where he taught full-time from 1966 until 2008. He served as president of the American Philological Association in 1992.

Biography
Born in Vienna, he received BAs from Columbia University and Oxford University, and the PhD from Harvard University in 1964. Gruen was a varsity lightweight rower at Columbia and valedictorian of his 550-man graduating class. From 1957 to 1960, he was a Rhodes Scholar at Merton College, Oxford.

His earlier work focussed on the later Roman Republic, and culminated in The Last Generation of the Roman Republic, a work often cited as a response to Ronald Syme's The Roman Revolution.  Gruen's argument is that the Republic was not in decay, and so not necessarily in need of "rescue" by Caesar Augustus and the institutions of the Empire.  He later worked on the Hellenistic period and on Judaism in the classical world.

Gruen taught what was purportedly his final undergraduate lecture course, The Hellenistic World, in the Fall of 2006. Despite his retirement from full-time teaching, he continues to oversee doctoral dissertations and is widely sought for visiting professorships.  In addition to U.C. Berkeley, Gruen has taught at Harvard University, the University of Colorado at Boulder, and Cornell University.  He says that his most inspirational teaching experience, however, was a brief stint instructing prisoners at San Quentin State Prison in the late 2000s. At Berkeley, his students have included Kenneth Sacks.

In 1969–70 and 1989–90, Gruen was the recipient of a Guggenheim Fellowship. He received the Austrian Cross of Honour for Science and Art in 1998.

Books

Roman Politics and the Criminal Courts, 149-78 BC (Cambridge MA, 1968)
The Image of Rome (ed.) (Englewood Cliffs NJ, 1969)
Imperialism in the Roman Republic (ed.) (NY, 1970)
The Roman Republic (Washington DC, 1972)
The Last Generation of the Roman Republic (Berkeley, 1974; pb edition 1995)
The Hellenistic World and the Coming of Rome, 2 vols. (Berkeley, 1984; pb 1986)
Studies in Greek Culture and Roman Policy (Leiden, 1990; pb 1996))
Culture and National Identity in Republican Rome (Ithaca, 1992; pb 1994)
Images and Ideologies: Self-Definition in the Hellenistic World (co-ed.) (Berkeley, 1993)	
Hellenistic Constructs: Essays in Culture, History, and Historiography (co-ed.) (Berkeley, 1997)
Heritage and Hellenism: The Reinvention of Jewish Tradition (Berkeley, 1998)
Diaspora: Jews amidst Greeks and Romans (Cambridge MA, 2002) (Reviews: Bryn Mawr Classical Review 2002.10.33)
Rethinking the Other in Antiquity (Princeton, 2010)

References

External links
Gruen's Home page  at the UCB History Department web site
CV of Erich S. Gruen

1935 births
Living people
Writers from Vienna
Austrian emigrants to the United States
21st-century American historians
American male non-fiction writers
American classical scholars
Historians of ancient Rome
American Rhodes Scholars
Columbia College (New York) alumni
Alumni of Merton College, Oxford
Harvard University alumni
Classical scholars of Harvard University
Classical scholars of the University of California, Berkeley
Recipients of the Austrian Cross of Honour for Science and Art
Prosopographers of ancient Rome
Fellows of Merton College, Oxford
Historians from California
21st-century American male writers